The Library Services Act (LSA) was passed by the U.S. Congress in 1956. Its purpose was to promote the development of public libraries in rural areas through federal funding. It was passed by the 84th United States Congress as the H.R. 2840 bill, which the 34th President of the United States Dwight D. Eisenhower signed into law on June 19, 1956. Julia Wright Merrill, Secretary of the Public Library Extension Committee of the American Library Association, was instrumental in the legislative process.  

To receive funding, states needed to submit a plan to the Commissioner of Education that demonstrated how the funds would be used, whether for library personnel, books, or equipment. Thus, making state and local governments prioritize the improvement of their libraries while also establishing their own initiatives and objectives. Since federal government was not favorably looked upon at the time, the law stated multiple times the state’s authority regarding any decisions toward the library’s goals, management, or collection.

However, up until 1961, Indiana was the only state that did not accept federal funds. Governor Harold Handley believed that by accepting the funds, “Hoosiers would be brainwashed with books handpicked by the Washington bureaucrats.” U.S. Representative John Brademas of Indiana vehemently disagreed. It was reported that Gov. Handley rejected approximately $700,000 to improve the library services.

Overall, the LSA had a major positive impact on libraries throughout the rest of the country. An additional 5 million books and other informational and educational materials were secured for rural communities. Many libraries noted a 40% or more increase in book circulation as well, along with a 32% increase in interlibrary loans.

Other accomplishments included 288 bookmobiles for rural communities and 800 new library staff members. Multitype and public library systems were established due to the LSA as well. When the Library Services and Construction Act became effective in 1964, the formation of regional and statewide library networks continued to grow.

The LSA was set to expire in 1961, but plans were already in motion to prolong the act. On May 26, 1960, the Senate passed a five-year extension without a single opposing vote.

Only a few years later, the Library Services and Construction Act would be introduced replacing the Library Services Act.

References 

1956 in the United States
Library law